Baraban is a rural locality (a village) in Bolshegondryskoye Rural Settlement, Kuyedinsky District, Perm Krai, Russia. The population was 153 as of 2010. There are 3 streets.

Geography 
Baraban is located 24 km southwest of Kuyeda (the district's administrative centre) by road. Rabak is the nearest rural locality.

References 

Rural localities in Kuyedinsky District